Dorothy Stringer School is a secondary school located in Brighton, East Sussex, England. It has over 1,600 pupils and 115 members of staff. There are 64 forms, each with an average of 26 students.

Location and history 
The school, named after a 20th-century Mayoress of Brighton, opened in 1955. Dorothy Stringer is on the same campus as Balfour Primary School, Varndean Secondary School and Varndean College Sixth Form College. The campus is bounded by Surrenden Road, Loder Road, Balfour Road and Friar Crescent, with Stringer Way providing an alternative entrance via the main staff car park. Local buses include the 5B, the 94 and 94a, which serve as combined school buses for Dorothy Stringer and Varndean to Hanover and Kemptown.

With the exception of Balfour Primary School, each of the institutions used to exist in a different educational form; Dorothy Stringer was a Secondary Modern School, whilst Varndean College and Varndean School were Boys' and Girls' grammar schools respectively.

In 2003, the school was the subject of a Private Finance Initiative (PFI) programme involving several other schools (including the neighbouring Varndean Secondary School, Blatchington Mill School and Sixth Form College and what was the COMART College of Media and Arts), as well as the construction firm Jarvis. For Dorothy Stringer this involved the construction of a new sports hall and associated facilities, new music suites, art studios and some new ICT suites.

Awards and initiatives 
Dorothy Stringer gained the Eco-Schools Green Flag award in 2000 and has maintained its status, updating the school as rules become stricter. It was the only secondary school in Brighton to hold this award until its renewal in June 2016, and the school secured the award for the 9th time in 2021. In the late 1990s, the school focused on recycling and improving the look of the school grounds. Since 2000 the Dorothy Stringer Environmental Partnership has focused on increasing the biodiversity of the grounds and solar power. In 2003, a dilapidated classroom building set among the woodland was renovated into the Brian Foster Environment Centre, named after a late teacher. From this base, Dorothy Stringer has become the lead environmental school in Brighton and Hove, forming international links with St Joseph's School in Le Havre for which funding from the Franco-British Council was won, and a student exchange trip is run for Year Seven pupils. Dorothy Stringer is also known for its forming of links with neighbouring schools and, within the school, involving a large number of students in educational environmental activities.

Dorothy Stringer became a specialist sports school in 2002 and despite the government abolishing specialisms in schools in 2012, sport remains an important feature: pupils receive at least two hours of sport education a week, in line with government guidelines. Becoming a sports school has entailed the demolition of the sports hall and the construction of a new venue twice the size, with an additional dance studio, gym and changing rooms. As part of the school's responsibilities as a sports school, Dorothy Stringer undertakes work to promote sport in local primary schools, which is chiefly done through the JSLA and a new scheme which involves establishing and nurturing dance clubs in local primary schools and organising a mass performance at the Brighton Dome.

Dorothy Stringer is also a part of the Healthy School initiative, a Partnership Promotion School, a Training School, a recipient of money from the Big Lottery Fund for the school newsletter, and benefits from the  European Union's III A programme. Dorothy Stringer has long owned the Dolawen Centre, an outdoor pursuits centre on a working farm in the Snowdonia National Park near Bangor, north-west Wales. This facility allows the school to organise annual trips for its Year 7 pupils and lease the building for the use of other schools, organisations and individuals.

In January 2017, Dorothy Stringer was listed as one of the UK's best state schools in Tatler Magazine, which praised the school's GCSE results and sports facilities.

Academies Act 2010 
On 25 June the new Conservative-Liberal coalition released details of 'Outstanding' schools that had, so far, expressed an interest in Academy status, under the Academies Act 2010. Dorothy Stringer School was one of the education establishments on this list, indicating the governors' wish to receive more information and explore all possible options.

Notable former students 
 Harley Alexander-Sule, musician from hip-hop group Rizzle Kicks
 Jessica Hynes, actor and comedian
 Lucy Griffiths, actor
 Will Becher, film director, Aardman Animations
 Steve Palmer, footballer
 James Daly, footballer
 Seann Walsh, comedian

Ken Browne incident 
In September 2009 it was revealed that a senior member of the school's teaching staff, Ken Browne, had been arrested in July of that year under suspicion of possessing indecent images of children such as pictures of girls from year 7 in changing rooms. The school attempted to pre-empt scandal by first releasing information of Browne's arrest to parents via a letter, before later contacting the local paper, The Argus. Ken Browne was immediately removed from the teaching staff at the school and has since moved from the area. On 20 January 2011, Browne pleaded guilty to his charges and later that year was sentenced to 10 months in prison.

References

Bibliography

External links 
School website

Secondary schools in Brighton and Hove
Community schools in Brighton and Hove
Educational institutions established in 1955
1955 establishments in England